Baggböle Manor is a manor house, located on the Ume River in Baggböle, about  northwest of the city of Umeå in northern Sweden. It was completed in 1846 as the residence for the manager of Baggböle Sawmill.

History
The large house was completed in 1846 as the residence for the manager of Baggböle Sawmill.
The architectural plans for the building were created by the minister of Umeå parish, Johan Anders Linder, who along with being a writer and minister was often hired as architect and builder in and around Umeå. He designed in the Empire style. Linder records that he was awarded 50 Swedish crowns for his design work at the opening ceremony of the building in 1847, by James Robertson Dickson, representing the Gothenburg firm of James Dickson & Co that had acquired the sawmill in 1840. Dickson would spend time in court twice accused of what has since been called "baggböleri" in Sweden, i.e. illegal felling of timber in forests belonging to the Crown.

The architecture 
The mansion was built of timber covered with planed wood panels, and was painted with a white linseed oil-based paint to make it resemble a contemporary stone house. With  of floor space on two floors it was one of the area's largest homes. Both the front and the rear of the building has a neoclassical facade decorated with Doric pilasters, and both the inside and the outside of the mansion is still very well preserved. Very little is, however, preserved of the two wings of the mansion, the garden, and the various other buildings that originally belonged to the mansion, buildings that included a school, a stable, two gazebos and a skittle alley.

Sawmill era 
The mansion was built at the top of the river bank, overlooking the buildings that were gathered closer to the water, in an area that now holds an arboretum: barracks for the workers, offices, materiel sheds, a blacksmith's shop, a coal house and a boathouse. Neither those buildings nor the two actual sawmills – the upper built in 1842, the lower in 1850, with eight water-powered powersaws in each - are, however, left today. All that has been preserved is one of the saws, which has been restored to working order and can be seen at the Umeå Energi Klabböle kraftverk in the village of Klabböle, just across the Ume River from Baggböle.
 
After the heyday of the sawmill at Baggböle - from 1850 to 1880, with at its peak 170 workers in the mill - both the operations and some of the barracks for the workers were moved to a new steam-powered sawmill in Holmsund, the port at the mouth of the Ume River that the lumber was shipped from, while the sawmill and its associated buildings at Baggböle were abandoned. Except for this house which until 1958 was used by the manager of the local power plant.

In the modern era 
For the next 35 years it was used by the congregation, who, primarily through voluntary work, also established the mansion as a popular summer cafe, making it a popular place to visit, not least for the annual celebration of Walpurgis Night. In 2006 the manor was bought by a private businessman, who started further renovations of the building, which is now used for business conferences and as a restaurant.

References 

The article was based on :sv:Baggböle herrgård on the Swedish Wikipedia.

Further reading
 magazine Västerbotten 1981:4 page 246–249 Retrieved May 16, 2014
 National Encyclopedia

External links 

Baggböle herrgård
Besöksområdet Baggböle

Houses completed in 1846
Buildings and structures in Umeå Municipality
Culture in Umeå
1846 in Sweden
Manor houses in Sweden